Vaneh Kuh (also Romanized as Vaneh Kūh) is a village in Chehel Shahid Rural District, in the Central District of Ramsar County, Mazandaran Province, Iran. At the 2006 census, its population was 70, in 20 families.

References 

Populated places in Ramsar County